David Maher (30 November 1880 – 21 February 1936) was an English professional football inside and outside right who played in the Football League for Preston North End.

Career statistics

Honours 
Preston North End

 Football League Second Division: 1903–04

References

English footballers
Brentford F.C. players
English Football League players
Association football outside forwards
Association football inside forwards
Millwall F.C. players
Preston North End F.C. players
Carlisle United F.C. players
Southern Football League players
1880 births
Footballers from Poplar, London
1936 deaths